The 1970 Segunda División de Chile was the 19th season of the Segunda División de Chile.

Unión San Felipe was the tournament's champion.

Table

Relegation Playoffs

See also
Chilean football league system

References

External links
 RSSSF 1970

Segunda División de Chile (1952–1995) seasons
Primera B
Chil